The University of Kurdistan Hewlêr (UKH) is an educational institution in Erbil/Hewlêr the Kurdistan Region of Iraq. UKH was the fifth public university to be opened in the Kurdistan Region. It was established in 2006. The University Of Kurdistan Hewler obtained top ranking throughout the Region in 2018. 

The University Of Kurdistan Hewler became the first university in the Kurdistan Region to be accredited Internationally by ASIC in 2018. Dr.Shamal stated that “This recognition marks UKH as a high performing university that meets international standards. We aspire and work to become a leading university in the larger regional area.” 

The Kurdistan Regional Government's Ministry Of Higher Education applauded the University Of Kurdistan and its administration in the year 2019 for its remarkable standards and steps taken for higher education reform and its international standards based upon its accreditation by ASIC. 

Nechirvan Barzani, is the founder of UKH and the former Chancellor. Dr.Mohammed Mochtar, also known as Dr.Shamal, has previously served as Vice Chancellor of the University Of Kurdistan Hewler  On 29 May 2011, by invitation of Baban, UKH granted an Honorary Doctorate in Politics and International Relations to John Major, the former British prime minister (1991–1997) who had been very helpful to the Kurds during his term in office. In his speech, he described students of UKH as a "rare asset".

Gallery

References

External links 
 

Kurdistan
Buildings and structures in Erbil
Public universities
Educational institutions established in 2006
2006 establishments in Iraqi Kurdistan